The Water is a short film directed by Kevin Drew and starring Cillian Murphy, David Fox, and Leslie Feist.

Synopsis
The Water explores the past, present and future of a family over 24 hours. Set in the middle of a cold beautiful winter, it explores the complex and intimate dynamic between loved ones, and loss with regret and anticipation. The story, told like a visual poem, unfolds in silence, in the faces of the characters and in the beauty of music, leaving questions about death, life and love.

Cast
Cillian Murphy as The Son
David Fox as The Father
Leslie Feist as The Mother

Production
The film was shot over a period of two days in January 2008 in Toronto.

References

External links 
 
 

2009 films
2009 short films
Canadian drama short films
2000s English-language films
2000s Canadian films